Trout Brook is a community in the Canadian province of Nova Scotia, located in the Cape Breton Regional Municipality on Cape Breton Island.

Parks
Trout Brook Provincial Park

References
 Trout Brook on Destination Nova Scotia

Communities in the Cape Breton Regional Municipality
General Service Areas in Nova Scotia